The 2018 United States House of Representatives elections in Nebraska were held on Tuesday, November 6, 2018, to elect the three U.S. representatives from the U.S. state of Nebraska; one from each of the state's three congressional districts. Primaries were held on May 15, 2018. The elections and primaries coincided with the elections and primaries of other federal and state offices.

The 2018 elections saw all three incumbents elected (all from the Republican Party), thus the GOP retained control of all three House seats.

Overview

District
Results of the 2018 United States House of Representatives elections in Nebraska by district:

District 1

The incumbent is Republican Jeff Fortenberry, who has represented the district since 2005. He was re-elected with 69% of the vote in 2016.

Democratic primary
 Dennis Crawford, attorney
 Jessica McClure, chemist

Primary results

Republican primary
 Jeff Fortenberry, incumbent

Primary results

General election

Polling

Results

District 2

The incumbent is Republican Don Bacon, who has represented the district since 2017. He flipped the district and was elected with 49% of the vote in 2016.

Democratic primary
 Brad Ashford, former U.S. Representative
 Kara Eastman, founder of Omaha Healthy Kids Alliance and Vice Chair of the Metropolitan Community College Board of Governors

Endorsements

Primary results

Republican primary
 Don Bacon, incumbent

Primary results

General election

Polling

Results

District 3

The incumbent is Republican Adrian Smith, who has represented the district since 2007. He was re-elected unopposed in 2016.

Democratic primary
 Paul Theobald, educator and author

Primary results

Republican primary
 Larry Bolinger, author
 Arron Kowalski
 Kirk Penner, businessman
 Adrian Smith, incumbent

Primary results

General election

Results

References

External links
Candidates at Vote Smart 
Candidates at Ballotpedia 
Campaign finance at FEC 
Campaign finance at OpenSecrets

Official campaign websites for first district candidates
Jessica McClure (D) for Congress
Jeff Fortenberry (R) for Congress

Official campaign websites for second district candidates
Kara Eastman (D) for Congress
Don Bacon (R) for Congress

Official campaign websites for third district candidates
Paul Theobald (D) for Congress
Adrian Smith (R) for Congress

Nebraska
2018
United States House of Representatives